HMS Hampshire was one of six  armoured cruisers built for the Royal Navy in the first decade of the 20th century. She was assigned to the 1st Cruiser Squadron of the Channel Fleet upon completion. After a refit, she was assigned to the reserve Third Fleet in 1909 before going to the Mediterranean Fleet in 1911. She was transferred to the China Station in 1912 and remained there until the start of the First World War in August 1914.

The ship hunted for German commerce raiders until she was transferred to the Grand Fleet at the end of 1914. She was assigned to the 7th Cruiser Squadron upon her return home. She was transferred to the 2nd Cruiser Squadron in 1916 and was present at the Battle of Jutland. Several days later, on 5 June, she was sailing to Arkhangelsk, Russia, carrying the Secretary of State for War, Field Marshal Lord Kitchener, when she is believed to have struck a mine laid by a German submarine. She sank with 737 of 749 people aboard killed, including Kitchener and his staff. Rumours later circulated of German spies and sabotage being involved in the sinking. Her wreck is listed under the Protection of Military Remains Act, though parts were later salvaged. Several films have been made exploring the circumstances of her loss.

Design and description
Hampshire was designed to displace . The engines were powered by seventeen Yarrow and six cylindrical boilers.

Her main armament consisted of four breech-loading (BL)  Mk I guns mounted in four single-gun turrets, one each fore and aft of the superstructure and one on each side. Her secondary armament of six BL  Mk VII guns was arranged in casemates amidships. Four of these were mounted on the main deck and were only usable in calm weather. Hampshire also carried 18 quick-firing (QF) 3-pounder Hotchkiss guns and two submerged  torpedo tubes. Her two 12-pounder 8 cwt guns could be dismounted for service ashore.

At some point in the war, the main deck six-inch guns of the Devonshire-class ships were moved to the upper deck and given gun shields. Their casemates were plated over to improve seakeeping and the four 3-pounder guns displaced by the transfer were landed.

The armour of the gun turrets was also five inches thick, whilst that of their barbettes was six inches thick.

Construction and service
Hampshire, named to commemorate the English county, was laid down by Armstrong Whitworth at their Elswick shipyard on 1 September 1902 and launched on 24 September 1903. She was completed on 15 July 1905 and was initially assigned to the 1st Cruiser Squadron of the Channel Fleet together with most of her sister ships. She began a refit at Portsmouth Royal Dockyard in December 1908 and was then assigned to the reserve Third Fleet in August 1909. She recommissioned in December 1911 for her assignment with the 6th Cruiser Squadron of the Mediterranean Fleet and was transferred to the China Station in 1912.

First World War
When the war began, she was in Wei Hai Wei, and was assigned to the small squadron led by Vice Admiral Martyn Jerram, commander-in-chief of the China Station. She was ordered to destroy the German radio station at Yap together with the armoured cruiser  and the light cruiser . En route, the ships captured the collier  on 11 August and sank her; Hampshire was too short on coal by then to make the island so Jerram ordered her back to Hong Kong with the crew of the Elspeth. At the end of the month, she was ordered down to the Dutch East Indies to search for any German ships at sea, narrowly missing the German light cruiser . The German ship had not been reported since the war began and she sailed into the Bay of Bengal and began preying upon unsuspecting British shipping beginning on 14 September. Hampshire then escorted an ANZAC troop convoy through the Indian Ocean and Red Sea to Egypt. Hampshire was refitted in Gibraltar in December before returning home to serve with the Grand Fleet. She was assigned the 7th Cruiser Squadron in January 1915 and was detached in November to escort shipping in the White Sea. She returned home in time to participate in the Battle of Jutland on 31 May 1916 with the 2nd Cruiser Squadron. During the battle, she was never actually engaged and only fired four salvos at the German II Scouting Group that fell well short of their targets, in addition to shooting at illusory submarine periscopes throughout the day.

Last voyage and sinking
Immediately after the battle, she was ordered to carry Lord Kitchener from Scapa Flow on a diplomatic mission to Russia via the port of Arkhangelsk. Due to the gale-force conditions, it was decided that Hampshire would sail through the Pentland Firth, then turn north along the western coast of the Orkney Islands. This course would provide a lee from the strong winds, allowing escorting destroyers to keep pace with her. As the ships turned to the northwest, the gale increased and shifted direction so that the ships were facing it head on. This caused the destroyers to fall behind Hampshire. As it was considered unlikely that enemy submarines would be active in such conditions, Hampshire'''s Captain Savill  ordered Unity and Victor to return to Scapa Flow.

She had struck one of several mines laid by the German minelaying submarine U-75 on 28–29 May, just before the Battle of Jutland. The detonation had holed the cruiser between bows and bridge, and the lifeboats were smashed against the side of the ship by the heavy seas when they were lowered. About 15 minutes after the explosion, Hampshire sank by the bow. Of the 735 crewmembers and 14 passengers aboard, only 12 crew survived after coming ashore on three Carley floats. A total of 737 were lost, including Kitchener and all the members of the mission to Russia.

Fritz Joubert Duquesne – a Boer and German spy – claimed to have assumed the identity of Russian Count Boris Zakrevsky and joined Kitchener in Scotland. Duquesne supposedly signalled a German U-boat shortly after departing Scapa Flow to alert them that Kitchener's ship was approaching. He was then rescued by the submarine as Hampshire sank. In the 1930s and 1940s, he ran the Duquesne Spy Ring and was captured by the FBI along with 32 other Nazi agents in the largest espionage conviction in U.S. history.

Wreck

The wreck is designated as a controlled site under the Protection of Military Remains Act at coordinates  and diving is forbidden without a licence.

Memorials

In 1983, one propeller and part of Hampshires drive shaft were salvaged from the wreck. They are now on view at the Scapa Flow Visitor Centre and Museum, Lyness, Hoy, Orkney. Three Vickers 3 Pounder Mk II Quick-Firing deck guns were also salvaged from the wreck. In 2021. One of these was restored to its original condition by specialist conservators in Alloa, and is now on display in the foyer of the museum.

The 737 Hampshire dead are commemorated on the right-hand side of the base at the Hampshire, Isle of Wight and Winchester War Memorial outside Winchester Cathedral.

A tower was erected on Marwick Head on Mainland, Orkney, in 1926 by the people of Orkney to the memory of Kitchener and the officers and men of Hampshire. The Kitchener Memorial is a square, crenellated stone tower with the inscription: "This tower was raised by the people of Orkney in memory of Field Marshal Earl Kitchener of Khartoum on that corner of his country which he had served so faithfully nearest to the place where he died on duty. He and his staff perished along with the officers and nearly all the men of HMS Hampshire on 5 June 1916."

Media
The sinking of the ship and the events surrounding Kitchener's death are portrayed in the 1921 film How Kitchener Was Betrayed, the 1969 film Fraulein Doktor about a female spy, and the 2021 film The King's Man, a prequel to 2015's Kingsman: The Secret Service.

Notes

Footnotes

 Bibliography 
 

 
 

 
 
 Budge, Brian; Callister, Jude; Grieve, Issy; Heath, Kevin; Hollinrake, Andrew; Irvine, James; Johnson, Keith; Kermode, Neil; Lowrey, Michael; Muir, Tom; Turton, Emily & Wade, Ben (2016) HMS Hampshire: A Century of Myths and Mysteries Unravelled.'' Kirkwall, Orkney, UK: Orkney Heritage Society.

External links

Orkney Heritage Society's site dedicated to casualties of HMS Hampshire and HM Drifter Laurel Crown
HMS Hampshire memorial site
Battle of Jutland Crew Lists Project - HMS Hampshire Crew List

Devonshire-class cruisers (1903)
Ships built by Armstrong Whitworth
Ships built on the River Tyne
1903 ships
World War I cruisers of the United Kingdom
Maritime incidents in 1916
World War I shipwrecks in the North Sea
Protected Wrecks of the United Kingdom
Ships sunk by mines
Ships sunk by German submarines in World War I